N.A.S.A. is an American hip hop music group that formed in Los Angeles, California. Consisting of Sam Spiegel and Zé Gonzales. N.A.S.A. stands for North America/South America and its members have collaborated with dozens of other artists from both the East and West Coasts of the U.S. and abroad. The group has been inactive since 2020, following the release of "The Spirit of Apollo (10th Anniversary Special Edition).

Early history
Sam and Zé met at a friend's studio in April 2003 and began making music together shortly after that.

Initially, the two began producing music together purely for fun, using samples of rare Brazilian records from the 1960s and 1970s (discovered through a shared love of "crate digging") but this quickly developed into recording music seriously with several of their favorite musicians.

Sam and Zé wanted their new project to bring people from vastly different backgrounds together through a shared inspiration and love of music. Thus N.A.S.A. was born and they have since collaborated with artists as disparate as Ol' Dirty Bastard, Karen O, Fatlip, George Clinton, Chali 2na, Tom Waits, Kool Keith, Kanye West, David Byrne, Childish Gambino, Lizzo, and DMX.

Discography
Albums
2009: "The Spirit of Apollo"
2010: "The Big Bang" (An album of remixes of The Spirit of Apollo)

Singles
2009: "Gifted (feat. Kanye West, Santigold and Lykke Li)"
2009: "Money (feat. Chuck D, Z-Trip, David Byrne, Ras Congo and Seu Jorge)"
2009: "Whachadoin? (feat. M.I.A., Spank Rock, Santigold & Nick Zinner)"
2010: "Chase The Devil"
2012: "Samo © (feat. Kool Kojak and Fab Five Freddy)"
2012: "Overdrive (feat. Maximum Hedrum)"
2013: "Hide (feat. Aynzil Jones)"
2013: "Hide (feat. Aynzil Jones) (Tropkillaz Remix)"
2013: "Hide (feat. Aynzil Jones and Childish Gambino) (Tropkillaz Remix)"
2013: "Hide (feat. Aynzil Jones) (A Skillz Remix)"
2014: "I Shot the Sheriff (feat. Karen O)"
2014: "I Shot the Sheriff (feat. Karen O) (Tropkillaz Remix)"
2015: "Hands Up, Don't Shoot! (feat. Sean Paul and Lizzo)"
2015: "Iko (feat. Lizzo)"
2015: "Iko (feat. Lizzo) (Tropkillaz Remix)"
2015: "Jihad Love Squad (feat. KRS-One)"
2015: "Meltdown (feat. DMX and Priyanka Chopra)"
2015: "Wake The Fuck Up (feat. Fatlip and Maximum Hedrum)"
2015: "R.I.P. That Beat (feat. Cory Enemy and Fatlip)"
2015: "Hey Hey Hey (feat. Spoek Mathambo and Donnis)"
2016: "We Takin' Over (feat. Fatlip and Kate Boy)"
2016: "Jihad Love Squad (feat. KRS-One) (Tropkillaz Remix)"
2016: "Jihad Love Squad (feat. KRS-One) (Wuki Remix)"

Remixes
2009: Yeah Yeah Yeahs - Zero (N.A.S.A. Bloody Lobo)
2013: Yeah Yeah Yeahs - Mosquito (N.A.S.A. Sucks Theramin Remix)
2014: Stan Getz - The Girl From Ipanema (N.A.S.A. Remix)
2015: Missy Elliott - Get Ur Freak On (N.A.S.A. Bootleg Remix)

Mixtapes
2020: Space Debris

References

External links
Pitchfork Review of N.A.S.A.

American hip hop groups
Musical groups established in 2004
Anti- (record label) artists